Maghbazar or Mogbazar is the name of a neighborhood in Dhaka, Bangladesh. It is located near the neighborhoods of Tejgaon, Ramna and Malibagh.  It is under Ramna thana and administered by the Dhaka South City Corporation. Its origins date back to the Mughal Empire.

Location
Coordinates: 23°44'55"N,90°24'28"E
Ramna Thana

History

Maghbazar is named after the Maghs or Mogs, whose ancestors were originally from Arakan Burma. In 1620, the Magh kingdom was attacked by the Mughals at ancient Dhaka, the heart of Bengal. The Mughal subedar Islam Khan, under the Mughals gained victory over the Maghs at their base at Chittagong. Their leader Mukut Ray surrendered, and along with his followers, accepted Islam; after which the subedar permitted them to stay in the area of what is now known as Maghbazar. However, the historian Muntasir Mamun holds the view that it was named during the British rule when the then Magh leader King Bring and his followers lived here. It was covered with dense forests even until the middle of the 19th century.

Shah Nuri Bengali established a khanqah in Maghbazar in the late 18th century. This attracted people from all over to Maghbazar, including the Naib Nazims and Nawabs of Dhaka who became disciples of Shah Nuri, and his spiritual successors.

List of educational institutions
 Ispahani Girls School and College
 Sacred Heart Tutorial School
 Dhaka Community Medical College and Hospital
 Holy Family Medical College
 ad-Din Medical College
 Dr. Sirajul Islam Medical College
 University Dental College
 National Bank Public School and College
 National College of Law
 Nazrul Shikkhaloy
 Maghbazar Girls' School
 Siddheshwari University College
 Sher-e-Bangla High School 
 Shahnuri High School
 Lions Model School
 Maghbazar Primary Government School
 St. Mary's International School
 Nayatola Government Primary School
BTCL Ideal School and College
 Ad-din Women's Medical College
Maghbazar also has the Department of Technical Education, Department of Women's Affairs, Endowments Office, the Red Crescent office, and RAB battalions' 3 offices.

References

Neighbourhoods in Dhaka